The 38th Fajr Film Festival (Persian: سی و هشتمین جشنواره فیلم فجر) was held from 1 to 11 February 2020 in Tehran, Iran. The nominees for the 38th Fajr Film Festival were announced on February 10, 2020, at a press conference.

Jury

Main Competition 
 Narges Abyar
 Touraj Aslani
 Abbas Blondie
 Reza Pour Hossein
 Fereydoun Jeyrani
 Saeed Rad
 Mohammad Mehdi Asgarpour
 Tahmaseb Solhjoo
 Maziar Miri

First Look, Short Film, Documentary 
 Mehdi Jafari
 Rouhollah Hejazi
 Mostafa Razagh Karimi
 Fereshteh Taerpour
 Hadi Moghadamdoost

Advertising Competition 

 Mohammad Rouhollamin
 Amir Sheiban Khaghani
 Habib Majidi

Winners and nominees

Main Competition

First Look

Advertising Competition

Films with multiple wins

Films with multiple nominations

Films

Main Competition

First Look

Documentary

Short Film

Out of competition

References

External links 
 

Fajr International Film Festival ceremonies
Fajr Film Festival
Fajr Film Festival
Fajr Film Festival